Carpe Diem e-Learning Community is a charter school for grades 6–12 in Yuma, Arizona.

The school is unique, since students do most their work on computers. The school has their own website where students can listen to lectures from the teachers at the headquarters of the school and do their work at their own pace, achieving credits when the work is completed.  The school maintains a traditional physical campus, however. Sometime in the 2015–2016 school year, the school was bought by Desert View Schools, and was subsequently renamed Desert View Middle and High School. In January 2020, the school announced its decision to abandon its high school and continue solely as a middle school. The current building is located at 3777 W. 22nd Lane, Yuma, AZ 85364.

External links
 cdayuma.com – the school website before October 2011
 carpediemschools.com – the school website after October 2011
 mhs.dvsk12.com – the school website after 2016

Public middle schools in Arizona
Public high schools in Arizona
Schools in Yuma County, Arizona
Charter schools in Arizona
Buildings and structures in Yuma, Arizona